Unimate was the first industrial robot,
which worked on a General Motors assembly line at the Inland Fisher Guide Plant in Ewing Township, New Jersey, in 1961.

It was invented by George Devol in the 1950s using his original patent filed in 1954 and granted in 1961. The patent begins:
The present invention relates to the automatic operation of machinery, particularly the handling apparatus, and to automatic control apparatus suited for such machinery.
Devol, together with Joseph Engelberger, his business associate, started the world's first robot manufacturing company, Unimation.

The machine undertook the job of transporting die castings from an assembly line and welding these parts on auto bodies, a dangerous task for workers, who might be poisoned by toxic fumes or lose a limb if they were not careful.

The original Unimate consisted of a large computer-like box, joined to another box and was connected to an arm, with systematic tasks stored in a drum memory.

In 2003 the Unimate was inducted into the Robot Hall of Fame.

In popular culture
Fictional robots called Unimate, designed by the character Alan von Neumann, Jr., appeared in comic books from DC Comics.

References

External links
Electronic robot 'Unimate' works in a building in Connecticut, United States. Newsreel footage

Industrial robots
Historical robots
1956 robots
Robotics at Unimation